Beaver Creek is a stream in Mower and Fillmore counties, in the U.S. state of Minnesota. It is a tributary of the Upper Iowa River.

Beaver Creek was probably named for the North American beavers which inhabit the stream.

See also
List of rivers of Minnesota

References

Rivers of Fillmore County, Minnesota
Rivers of Mower County, Minnesota
Rivers of Minnesota